Bader is a village in Ladnun Tehsil in Nagaur district of Rajasthan, India. It comes under Bakliya Panchayat. It is 90 km east of the district headquarters in Nagaur, 11 km from Ladnu and 179 km from the state capital, Jaipur.

Ladnu, Didwana, Sujangarh  are the nearby Cities to Bader.

Location
Bader Village is situated Between Ladnun and Didwana Road. 11 km From ladnun in south and 22 km From Didwana in north.

References

Villages in Nagaur district